"North Hamgyeong Province" or "Hamgyeongbuk-do" is, according to South Korean law, a province of the Republic of Korea, as the South Korean government formally claims to be the legitimate government of whole of Korea. The area constituting the province is under the de facto jurisdiction of North Korea.

As South Korea does not recognize changes in administrative divisions made by North Korea, official maps of the South Korean government shows North Hamgyeong Province in its pre-1945 borders. The area corresponds to North Korea's North Hamgyong Province, Rason Special City and part of Ryanggang Province.

To symbolize its claims, the South Korean government established the Committee for the Five Northern Korean Provinces as an administrative body for the five northern provinces. A governor for North Hamgyeong Province is appointed by the President of South Korea.

Administrative divisions 
Hamgyeongbuk-do is divided into 3 cities (si) and 11 counties (gun).

City 
 Cheongjin (hangul: 청진, hanja: 淸津)
 60 dong
 Najin (나진, 羅津)
 80 dong
 Seongjin (성진, 城津)
 11 dong

County 
 Gyeongseong (경성, 鏡城) (administrative center at Gyeongseong-myeon)
 2 eup : Jueul, Eodaejin
 4 myeon : Gyeongseong, Eorang, Jubuk, Junam
 Myeongcheon (명천, 明川) (administrative center at Sangwubuk-myeon)
 10 myeon : Sangwubuk, Dong, Sangga, Sanggo, Sangwunam, Seo, Agan, Haga, Hago, Hawu
 Gilju (길주, 吉州)
 1 eup : Gilju
 5 myeon : Deoksan, Donghae, Yangsa, Ungpyeong, Jangbaek
 Hakseong (학성, 鶴城) (administrative center at Seongjin)
 5 myeon : Hakseo, Hakdong, Hakjung, Haknam, Haksang
 Buryeong (부령, 富寧)
 8 myeon : Buryeong, Gwanhae, Bugeo, Samhae, Seosang, Seokmak, Yeoncheon, Cheongam
 Musan (무산, 茂山)
 1 eup : Musan
 9 myeon : Dong, Samjang, Samsa, Seoha, Eoha, Yeonsa, Yeonsang, Yeongbuk, Punggye
 Hoenyeong (회녕, 會寧)
 1 eup : Hoenyeong
 6 myeon : Byeokseong, Boeul, Yongheung, Changdu, Paleul, Hwapyeong
 Jongseong (종성, 鍾城)
 6 myeon : Jongseong, Namsan, Yonggye, Punggok, Haengyeong, Hwabang
 Onseong (온성, 穩城)
 6 myeon : Onseong, Namyang, Mipo, Yeongwa, Yeongchung, Hunyung
 Gyeongwon (경원, 慶源)
 6 myeon : Gyeongwon, Dongwon, Asan, Annong, Yongdeok, Yudeok
 Gyeongheung (경흥, 慶興) (administrative center at Unggi-eup)
 2 eup : Unggi, Aoji
 3 myeon : Gyeonghung, Punghae, Noseo

See also 
 The Committee for the Five Northern Korean Provinces
 North Hamgyong Province of the Democratic People's Republic of Korea (North Korea)
 Hamgyong, historical Eight Provinces of Korea

References

Provinces of South Korea
States and territories established in 1949